Cora Linn Daniels (Morrison; pen names, Australia and Lucrece; March 17, 1852 – 1934) was a 19th-century American author from Massachusetts. She served as editor of the literature department of William Henry Harrison Murray's weekly newspaper , The Golden Rule (1875–78). For 10 years, she was the New York literary and dramatic correspondent for The Hartford Times. For 25 years, she was worked as a travel and general correspondent to the press. The best work of her life, which she valued beyond the novels, was published in an illustrated volume entitled As It is to Be. A bibliophile, Daniels collected a library of a 1,000 volumes, which she kept packed away in boxes. She was a member of the American Folklore Society, and the Theosophical Society. Daniels was a Fellow of the Royal Asiatic Society of Great Britain and Ireland.

Early life and education
Cora Linn (or "Coralinne") Morrison was born in Lowell, Massachusetts, March 17, 1852, the daughter of Abram B. Morrison and Mary Elizabeth Pond Morrison. She is descended from the Morrisons, hereditary judges in the Hebrides Islands since 1613, on her father's side. The family motto being translated, reads: "Longheadedness is better than riches." She is descended from the Ponds, on her mother's side, upon whom a coat-of-arms with the motto, "Fide et Amore," was conferred by Henry VIII, in 1509. Her grandfather, General Lucas Pond, was for many years a member of the Massachusetts Senate. Her great-uncle, Enoch Pond, D.D., was president of the Bangor Theological Seminary in Bangor, Maine. She had at least one sibling, a brother, Abraham Cressy Morrison.

She was educated in the grammar school of Malden, Massachusetts. A private tutor took charge of her for two years. She was sent to Delacove Institute, near Philadelphia, and finished her studies in Dean Academy (now Dean College), Franklin, Massachusetts.

Career
Her literary life began with a poem published in the Independent in 1874. When William Henry Harrison Murray conceived the idea of publishing The Golden Rule, in Boston, he invited her to contribute a series of articles descriptive of prominent racehorses. She did so under the pen name "Australia". The articles were attributed to Mr. Murray himself and were so successful that they immediately led to an engagement, and she became literary editor, remaining on the staff three years. She also contributed much poetry to the paper under the pen name "Lucrece," but afterwards signed her own name, both to prose and poetry. Her clever poetry in Judge and other weeklies of the day was widely copied and is even translated into the French. Her poems were widely copied and sometimes translated into other languages, returning to this country by being re-translated for Littell's Living Age. Becoming New York correspondent for the Hartford Daily Times, her letters appeared regularly therein for 10 years, touching upon every possible subject, but more particularly devoted to dramatic criticism, art and reviews of notable books. It was at the Hartford Daily Times that she made her first hit with a series of bright, sparkling letters on life and manners in the Bermudas.

Among the reviews was a notice of Elihu Vedder's The philosophy of Omar Khayyam, the astronomer poet of Persia, which was reproduced in a pamphlet, which, being sent to Rome, was pronounced by Vedder the most comprehensive and excellent review that had been produced. Constantly contributing to a number of publications, her first novel, Sardia (Boston, 1891), was successful. The Bronze Buddha: A Mystery (University Press, 1899) was dedicated to her brother, Abraham.

The best work of her life, which she valued beyond any possible novel, was a work treating of what might be designated "The Science of the Hereafter", or "The Philosophy of After Death", which was published in an illustrated volume entitled As It is to Be (Press of King, Fowle & Co., 1892). It was reviewed by Frank Leslie's Popular Monthly who stated that it "is a singularly imaginative little book, by Mrs. Cora Linn Daniels, whose essay in romance, entitled Sardia (Lee and Shepard, 1891), attracted some attention a year or two since. Mrs. Daniels builds up an ingenious scheme of universal revelation, based upon individual psychological intimations—or, as she chooses to call them, 'the message of the Voices'. It is at times difficult to follow her logic, and impossible to keep up with it, so to speak; yet there is an enthusiasm about her writing which wins upon the sympathy if it does not conquer the conviction. There are abundant testimonials to this effect from men of eminence and authority. Professor Elliott Coues, for instance, writes: "If you commune with an extraneous spirit you have a wise, strong and good counselor. If you commune with your own higher spirit you must accept the very highest compliment from me."

Personal life
On July 10, 1871, at the age of 19, she married Joseph Heills Daniels (b. 1849), of Franklin, a member of one of the historic families of the neighborhood. Her travels in the U.S. have been extensive. She spent 20 winters in New York City, varied by trips to Washington, D.C., Bermuda and the West. Despite travel and the life of cities, her existence has been one of mental solitude. She has never found companionship of thought and labor. She has collected a library of a 1,000 volumes during 20 years, but they have been packed in boxes for 17 out of the 20. What she has done has been done alone, without books at hand, and usual incentives to new thought gained through literary intercourse. Her most-prized literary possession is a volume of more than three hundred letters from distinguished people all over the world, full of thanks and compliments for reviews and notes of themselves or their works. These attest to the quiet life of high thinking and the constant energy in working. Daniels was a member of the American Folklore Society, and an original member of the Theosophical Society. She was a Fellow of the Royal Asiatic Society, London.

Selected works

 1885, The philosophy of Omar Khayyam, the astronomer poet of Persia
 1891, Sardia. A story of love
 1892, As it is to be
 1899, The bronze Buddha A mystery
 1903, Encyclopaedia of superstitions, folklore, and the occult sciences of the world: A Comprehensive Library of Human Belief and Practice in the Mysteries of Life (with Charles MacClellan Stevens)
 19-?, The windharp

References

Attribution

Bibliography

External links
 
 
 As it is to be

1852 births
1934 deaths
19th-century American women writers
19th-century American novelists
American women novelists
People from Lowell, Massachusetts
Wikipedia articles incorporating text from A Woman of the Century